Hal is a 2018 American documentary film by Amy Scott about the film director Hal Ashby. It premiered at the Sundance Film Festival on January and was released theatrically by Oscilloscope Laboratories on September 7, 2018.

Summary
The film is a celebration of his life and work set against the backdrop of a rapidly changing America and an even more dramatic shift in filmmaking. Once the toast of New Hollywood, his rise and fall became another story of art against the film industry.

Reception
Rolling Stone included the film in its "10 Best Documentaries of 2018" and Entertainment Weekly included it in its "Sundance 2018: The 11 best films of this year's festival".

It earned  on Rotten Tomatoes. The site's critical consensus reads, "Hal pays affectionate tribute to a filmmaker whose offscreen life proves as engaging as his best work."

It was nominated for a Producers Guild Award for Outstanding Producer of Documentary Motion Pictures.

See also
2018 in film
List of female directors

References

External links

Hal on MUBI

2018 films
Documentary films about films
2018 documentary films
American documentary films
2010s English-language films
2010s American films